The episodes of the Japanese anime series We Were There, based on the manga series of the same name by Yuki Obata, was directed by Akitaro Daichi and produced by ArtLand.

References

We Were There